The Honda Avancier is a mid-size crossover SUV produced by Guangqi Honda, a joint venture between Japanese automaker Honda and Chinese automaker GAC, for China since late 2016.

Overview 
The first prototype of Avancier was displayed at the 2015 Auto Shanghai and debuted as the Concept D. Honda debuted a prototype version of the Avancier during the April 2016 Auto China and then during the September 2016 Chengdu Auto Show, to be marketed solely in China in October 2016. It is positioned above the CR-V and is currently sold as Honda's flagship crossover SUV in China.

2020 facelift 
The Avancier received a facelift in March 2020, updating the front and rear end designs and adding a 2-tone paint job option.

UR-V 
The UR-V is Dongfeng Honda-produced version of the Guangqi Honda-produced Avancier. It went on sale in March 2017.

2020 facelift 
The UR-V received a facelift in 2020.

References

External links 

  (Avancier)
  (UR-V)

Avancier (crossover)
Cars introduced in 2016
2020s cars
Cars of China
Mid-size sport utility vehicles
Crossover sport utility vehicles
Front-wheel-drive vehicles
All-wheel-drive vehicles
Vehicles with CVT transmission